The 1853 Alabama gubernatorial election took place on August 1, 1853, in order to elect the governor of Alabama. Democrat John A. Winston won his first term. Henry W. Collier did not run because he was term-limited.

Candidates

Democratic Party
 John A. Winston

Whig Party
 William S. Earnest
 Richard Wilde Walker, son of Senator John Williams Walker.

Unionist Party
 Alvis Q. Nicks

Election

References

Alabama gubernatorial elections
1853 Alabama elections
Alabama
August 1853 events